Denis Golenko (born 13 March 1996) is a Belarusian professional footballer who plays for Bumprom Gomel.

External links
 
 
 Profile at Gomel website

1996 births
Living people
People from Mogilev
Sportspeople from Mogilev Region
Belarusian footballers
Association football midfielders
FC Gomel players
FC Lokomotiv Gomel players
FC Belshina Bobruisk players
FC Naftan Novopolotsk players